The 2014 Maldives FA Cup Final is the 27th Final of the Maldives FA Cup.

Route to the final

Match

Details

See also
2014 Maldives FA Cup

References

Maldives FA Cup finals
FA Cup